Center Stage: On Pointe is a 2016 teen drama television film, directed by Director X and choreographed by Monica Proenca. The film stars Nicole Muñoz, Barton Cowperthwaite, Maude Green, Chloe Lukasiak, Kenny Wormald and Peter Gallagher. It premiered on Lifetime on June 25, 2016.

The official DVD was released September 6, 2016. It is the third installment in the Center Stage film series, following the 2000 film Center Stage and its sequel, Center Stage: Turn It Up.

Plot
To solve its financial problems, the American Ballet Company (ABC), headed by Jonathan Reeves (Peter Gallagher), seeks to expand its repertoire from ballet to add the more popular contemporary dance. Tommy (Kenny Wormald), Charlie (Sascha Radetsky), and Cooper (Ethan Stiefel) start a competitive camp to recruit new dancers for ABC.

Bella Parker (Nicole Muñoz) has always been in the shadow of her sister Kate (Rachele Brooke Smith), a famous ballet dancer. She changes her last name (Miller) to avoid comparisons and, to her surprise, she is chosen for the camp. Bella has trouble fitting in, and the instructor, Lorenza (Sarah-Jane Redmond), a ballet snob, is brutally critical of Bella's dancing. When she is partnered with quiet Damon (Barton Cowperthwite), however, she gains confidence, as the two open up to each other.

Rumors surface about one of the dancers, Allegra (Maude Green), and the dancers take sides. Bella strives to remain focused as the day of final audition arrives. When Allegra loses her partner, Bella generously lends her Damon; but in a surprise twist, Bella joins the two on stage, and all three are accepted to ABC.

Cast
 Nicole Muñoz as Bella Parker 
 Barton Cowperthwaite as Damon
 Maude Green as Allegra
 Peter Gallagher as Jonathan Reeves
 Sarah-Jane Redmond as Lorenza 
 Kenny Wormald as Tommy Anderson
 Sascha Radetsky as Charlie Sims
 Ethan Stiefel as Cooper Nielsen
 Rachele Brooke Smith as Kate Parker
 Chloe Lukasiak as Gwen Murphy
 Kyle Toy as Ivan
 Thomas L. Colford as Richard
 Kyal Legend as Candie
 Lanie McAuley as Wendy
 Kane Nelson as Sam
 Tara Wilson as Yoga Instructor

Production
The film was shot in Vancouver, British Columbia, Canada. Principal photography started and finished in November 2015.

Reception
Variety critic Sonia Saraiya found Center Stage: On Pointe wholly inferior to the original Center Stage, complimenting only the direction of Director X noting "...though it is frustrating that the film feels like 15-odd low-budget music videos strung together, the dance in those segments, and the way it's filmed, are some of the best parts of the movie." Cara Kelly of USA Today agreed that, like Center Stage: On Pointes strength "is still there: the nicely choreographed and heartfelt dance scenes performed by real dancers."

The A.V. Clubs Danette Chavez was more mixed in her review, giving the film a C+, and remarking that "Muñoz is a charming lead" but noting that "On Pointe gets too ambitious..." with the film's message. Keith Uhlich of The Hollywood Reporter was the most negative in his assessment of the film, criticizing all of the dance sequences in the film as "poorly staged and often inexplicably photographed in slow-motion", and surmising that, "By the time the climactic, Rihanna-scored musical number arrives, your attention will have long since waltzed off."

References

External links
 

Direct-to-video sequel films
Television sequel films
Films about ballet
Films directed by Director X
Films set in New York City
Films shot in Vancouver
Lifetime (TV network) films
2016 television films
2016 films